Arrest: Pat. Rizal Alih – Zamboanga Massacre (marketed as Arrest: Patrolman Risal Alih – Zamboanga Massacre) is a 1989 Filipino action film directed by comic book writer Carlo J. Caparas and written by Caparas and Tony Mortel. It stars Ramon Revilla as the titular patrolman, alongside Vilma Santos, Eddie Garcia, Marianne Dela Riva, Paquito Diaz, Raoul Aragonn, Baldo Marro, Charlie Davao, and Rosemarie Gil. Based on the Camp Cawa-Cawa siege in January 1989, the film was written and shot within the span of two months, receiving criticism from the chief of the Civil Relations Service of the Armed Forces of the Philippines who faulted it as "premature" and potentially inappropriate. Zamboanga Massacre was released by The Golden Lions Productions on March 8, 1989. Caparas considers Zamboanga Massacre to be among the films of which he is the proudest.

The real Alih only became aware of the film's existence in 2011 while in prison at Camp Crame, and the year after filed a libel complaint against Caparas and his wife, executive producer Donna Villa, for maligning his reputation. The case was ultimately dismissed by the Quezon City Prosecutor's Office as the prescription period for filing charges has already expired.

Plot
In 1984, Zamboanga City Mayor Cesar Climaco is murdered, and patrolman Rizal Alih is detained for his suspected involvement in the crime. In January 1989, Alih and his men take over Camp Cawa-Cawa, the military base where they were held, and hold Brigadier General Eduardo Batalla and Colonel Romeo Abendan hostage. After several shooting confrontations with the Philippine military, Alih ultimately beheads Gen. Batalla, and successfully escapes from the military base.

Cast
Ramon Revilla as Pat. Rizal Alih
Vilma Santos as Jocelyn, Rizal's fifth wife
Eddie Garcia as Brig. Gen. Eduardo Batalla
Marianne Dela Riva as Evelyn Batalla, wife of Brig. Gen. Eduardo
Paquito Diaz
Raoul Aragonn as Colonel Romeo Abendan
Baldo Marro as Idris
Charlie Davao as General Renato de Villa
Rosemarie Gil 
Dick Israel as Nasim
Rez Cortez
Robin Padilla
Conrad Poe
Roy Alvarez as Major Refe
Tony Carreon
Ruben Rustia as Mayor Cesar Climaco
Joonee Gamboa
Rocco Montalban
Joko Diaz
Mervin Samson
Rey Venus
Manny Doria
Robert Miller
Danny Riel
Bebeng Amora
Danny Labra

Production
The Golden Lions Production acquired the adaptation rights to the Camp Cawa-Cawa siege in January 1989, the same month that the incident occurred. The film's working title was Batalla-Alih Encounter: Zamboanga Massacre. According to director and co-writer Carlo J. Caparas in 2009, he was already shooting the film even as the siege was ongoing, as he wanted the scenes to be "really fresh".

Casting
In January 1989, director Carlo J. Caparas cast Vilma Santos, the highest-paid film actress in the Philippines at the time, for the role of Rizal Alih's wife, after Santos had to decline a role in Caparas' previous film Celestina Sanchez, Alyas Bubbles – Enforcer: Ativan Gang (commonly shortened to Bubbles). Her scenes were allegedly shot in only one day.

Controversy
Honesto Isleta, chief of the Civil Relations Service, Armed Forces of the Philippines (CRSAFP), criticized the film's production in late January 1989 for being "premature", as the Philippine military presumed that the actual Rizal Alih could still be alive. In addition, Isleta stated that Ramon Revilla, an established action star, would be inappropriate portraying Alih as the protagonist of the story. However, Isleta would admit that the military could not halt the film's production, so they would instead refuse to lease its equipment and firearms to the film crew.

Santanina Rasul, a Philippines senator who was part of the unsuccessful negotiations for releasing General Batalla, appealed to the filmmakers to have a balanced depiction of Alih in the film. Manuel Morato, chairman of the Movie and Television Review and Classification Board (MTRCB), later stated that though his agency could not impede the film's production, it would closely supervise it so as to avoid the glorification of Alih in the work.

Release
Zamboanga Massacre was graded "A" by the MTRCB, indicating a "Very Good" quality. The film was released by The Golden Lions Productions on March 8, 1989. Actor Roy Alvarez's agents, however, complained about the posters made for the film for not placing Alvarez's name above the title, arguing that his recent recognition in the internationally co-produced television film A Dangerous Life warrants a higher billing for the actor. Caparas later considered the film to be among the directorial works which he is most proud, alongside Pieta, Kahit Ako'y Lupa, and Bubbles.

Reaction of Rizal Alih and lawsuit
In November 2011, while the former renegade policeman Rizal Alih was serving his prison sentence at Camp Crame, he found out about the existence of Zamboanga Massacre for the first time from a prison officer who mentioned it to him. Alih later watched the film from the officer's laptop, and felt "so shocked, speechless and angry" that he could not finish the viewing; the film depicted him as having beheaded General Batalla, which he stated as "utterly baseless, malicious and a downright lie perpetrated in order to make the movie such a big hit".

A year later, Alih filed a libel complaint against director Caparas and his wife, executive producer Donna Villa, arguing that the filmmakers prioritized making "a huge profit at the expense of maligning my name and reputation". The case was dismissed by the Quezon City Prosecutor's Office, however, as the prescription period for filing charges had lapsed after more than two decades since the film's release. Alih later died in prison on August 14, 2015.

References

External links

1989 films
1989 action films
Action films based on actual events
Filipino-language films
Films about hostage takings
Films about military personnel
Films set in 1989
Films set in Zamboanga City
Philippine action films
Films directed by Carlo J. Caparas